Topvolley Precura Schelde-Natie Antwerpen is a volleyball club from Antwerp, Belgium. 

Antwerpen plays in the Liga, the highest level of Belgian men's volleyball. The club has been present at this level since 2008. They ended 5th after the regular competition of the 2008-09 season, but still had to participate in the playdowns after they lost a double confrontation against 8th placed PNV Waasland.

The club came into existence in 1995, after a merger between VC Zorgvliet Hoboken and First Antwerp Volley Team. Two years later, VC Zorgvliet Antwerpen promoted for the first time to the Liga. After some quite successful seasons and a participation in the 1998 CEV Cup, the club relegated in 2003. After five seasons at the second level, Antwerpen returned to the highest division.

The team merged with VBC Scheld-Natie Kapellen after the 2010-11 season. Kapellen were also playing in the Liga at that moment.

In 2014, the club secured the victory in the Belgian cup.

Squad
Coach:  Kris Tanghe

References

External links
Official site 

 

Belgian volleyball clubs
Sport in Antwerp